Coburg was an unincorporated town in Washington Township, Porter County, in the U.S. state of Indiana.

History
A post office was established at Coburg in 1876, and remained in operation until it was discontinued in 1906. The community was named after Cobourg, Ontario, the native home of an early settler. Coburg was a station and shipping point on the railroad.

References

Unincorporated communities in Porter County, Indiana
Unincorporated communities in Indiana